Lyubomir Ivanov (born 9 March 1960 in Sofia) is a Bulgarian former race walker.

Biography
Lyubomir Ivanov participated at one edition of the Summer Olympics (1988).

Achievements

References

External links
 

1960 births
Bulgarian male racewalkers
Living people
Athletes (track and field) at the 1988 Summer Olympics
Olympic athletes of Bulgaria